Kikači is a village in the municipality of Kalesija, Bosnia and Herzegovina.

Its subterritories include: Kundakovići, Gornji Kikači and Polje. It has an elementary school for 1st-5th grade children, a mosque and the football stadium Tom Cat Arena, home to the local club FK Mladost Kikači.

Demographics 
According to the 2013 census, its population was 1,804.

References

Populated places in Kalesija